Ralph Philip Martin (4 August 1925 – 25 February 2013) was a British New Testament scholar.

Martin was born in Anfield, Liverpool, England and was educated at the Liverpool Collegiate School, the University of Manchester and King's College London. He taught at the London Bible College, the University of Manchester, the University of Sheffield, Azusa Pacific University, and Fuller Theological Seminary.

Martin wrote commentaries on Mark, Romans, Philippians, and James. In 1992, a Festschrift was published in his honour, Worship, Theology and Ministry in the Early Church: Essays in Honor of Ralph P. Martin, which included contributions from James Dunn, E. Earle Ellis, Donald Guthrie, I. Howard Marshall, and Leon Morris.

Works

Books

—original published as Carmen Christi

References

1925 births
2013 deaths
People from Anfield
Alumni of the University of Manchester
Fuller Theological Seminary faculty
British biblical scholars
New Testament scholars
Alumni of King's College London
Academics of the University of Manchester
Academics of the University of Sheffield
Azusa Pacific University faculty
Bible commentators